Tartu Välk 494 is an ice hockey team located in Tartu, Estonia, and playing in the Coolbet Hokiliiga, the top tier of ice hockey in Estonia. They play home games at the Lõunakeskus Ice Hall.

History
Tartu Välk 494 was founded in April 1994, and the team won their first Meistriliiga Championship in 1997. Since then, team have gone on to win the league a further 10 times, with the most recent victory coming in 2020. In addition, they have twice won the now-defunct Estonian Cup, in 1997 and 1998.

By performing well in the Meistriliiga, Välk 494 have subsequently represented Estonia in continental competition on several occasions, initially during the 1997–98 IIHF Continental Cup where they finished 3rd in the group, after suffering losses to Latvian side Juniors Riga and the Ukrainian Sokil Kyiv, but they did manage a victory over Romanian outfit SC Miercurea Ciuc. They played in the Continental Cup the following year, finishing 2nd in their group having beaten HK Vojvodina and KHK Crvena zvezda, both Yugoslavian teams, but suffering a heavy loss to Ukrainian side HC Berkut-Kyiv. The 2009–10 Cup saw Välk 494 represent Estonia once again, beating the Lithuanian side SC Energija in Overtime, whilst suffering heavy losses against Kazakhstan's Saryarka Karaganda and KS Cracovia Kraków of Poland. Välk 494 would once again participate in the 2011–12 edition, comfortably beating Turkish side Başkent Yıldızları, before being beaten themselves by White Caps Turnhout of Belgium.

In 2020 Välk 494 took place in the inaugural Baltic Hockey League, a competition made up of two teams from each of Estonia, Latvia and Lithuania. They finished top of their group after beating Kaunas Hockey, however, their final game against HK Mogo was cancelled after 4 of the Välk 494 squad tested positive for COVID-19. Despite this, both Välk 494 and HK Mogo qualified for the final round, as both teams had already beaten the Lithuanian team. The finals of the tournament are scheduled to take place in February 2021, having been postponed from December 2020 to several HK Mogo players contracting the virus.

Name
Välk is the Estonian word for lightning, whilst the 494 in the team name refers to the month and year the club was founded. From their inception through to 2007 the team was known as Tartu Välk 494, before changing their name to Tartu Kalev-Välk. This moniker lasted until 2018, when the team reverted to the Välk 494 brand.

Roster 
Updated November 29, 2021.

Honours
Meistriliiga Championships:
 1997, 1999, 2000, 2002, 2003, 2008, 2011, 2012, 2015, 2019, 2020, 2021, 2022

Estonian Cup: 
 1997 & 1998

References

External links
 
eestihoki.ee 

Ice hockey clubs established in 1994
Sport in Tartu
Ice hockey teams in Estonia
Meistriliiga (ice hockey)
1994 establishments in Estonia